Supreme Records was a small, independent record label based in Los Angeles that existed from 1947 to 1950. It was founded by dentist Albert Patrick and specialized in rhythm and blues. Its artists included Jimmy Witherspoon, Paula Watson, Buddy Tate, Eddie Williams and his Brown Buddies (with Floyd Dixon), Big Jim Wynn, and Percy Mayfield.

Hits 
Supreme's two greatest hits were Paula Watson's "A Little Bird Told Me," which sold over a million copies, and Jimmy Witherspoon's version of "Ain't Nobody's Business," recorded on Albert Patrick's request, which lasted 34 weeks on Billboard's Rhythm & Blues hit list.

Lawsuits
Supreme got involved in a costly lawsuit against Decca for copyright infringement on the arrangement of Paula Watson's version of "A Little Bird Told Me," with their version of Evelyn Knight. The judge ruled in favor of Decca, stating that arrangements on an existing composition cannot be considered as property. He also stated that the arrangement on Watson's version lacked originality and the differences between the versions were evident.

In another lawsuit, the label lost its pressing and distribution partner Black & White Records after settling a dispute over Black & White selling its pressing line to Monogram in Canada.

Closing
Due to the financial duress from the lawsuits, Supreme shut down in 1950. Most of the masters were sold to Swing Time Records. "Two Years of Torture", recorded by Percy Mayfield was re-released by John Dolphin's label, Dolphin's of Hollywood.

References

External links
 Supreme Records at The Online Discographical Project

Record labels based in California
American independent record labels